James Kakalios (born December 27, 1958) is a physics professor at the University of Minnesota. Known within the scientific community for his work with amorphous semiconductors, granular materials, and 1/f noise, he is known to the general public as the author of the book The Physics of Superheroes, which considers comic book superheroes from the standpoint of fundamental physics.

Biography
Kakalios earned his B.S. degree from City College of New York in 1979 and his M.S. and PhD degrees from the University of Chicago in 1982 and 1985. He began his comic book collection as a graduate student as a way to relieve stress. At Minnesota, he taught a freshman seminar that focused on the physics of superheroes as a way to motivate students to think about physics. This course gained great popularity as an enticing alternative to the typical inclined planes and pulleys of physics.The seminar was a great success, leading to articles in popular magazines including People, lectures on the subject, and publication of The Physics of Superheroes.  In his talks, favorite examples are the death of Gwen Stacy (Spider-Man's girlfriend), "can Superman jump over tall buildings and what does this tell us about Krypton?", the high-velocity actions of The Flash, and the shrinking problem of the Atom.  His analysis of Gwen Stacy's death eventually became integral to the plot of a new Spider-Man comic.
Kakalios is of the opinion that the most unrealistic aspect of the comic-book universe is often the sociology.  He notes that pedestrians do not usually provide running monologues describing everything around them.  There is one aspect of the story of the Atom that he does not question, however.  The Atom begins as a physics professor, who encounters a chunk of white dwarf star and picks it up.  "By a conservative estimate, he is lifting about 5000 metric tons.  This is not unreasonable. We physics professors are just that strong."

He provides content on the DVD of the film Watchmen. Under extras, he is filmed discussing the physics of superheroes. As one of the film's lead scientific consultants of the 2012 film The Amazing Spider-Man, Kakalios designed the film's "decay rate algorithm", which was inspired by the real-life Gompertz–Makeham law of mortality.

Kakalios has been nominated by the University of Minnesota to be one of the USA Science and Engineering Festival's Nifty Fifty Speakers who will speak about his work and career to middle and high school students in October 2010.

James Kakalios was awarded an Honorary Doctor of Science degree from the University of Lincoln, UK (2017).

He was also awarded the AAAS Public Engagement with Science Award in 2014.

Works

References

External links
 

21st-century American physicists
Living people
Educators from Minnesota
University of Chicago alumni
University of Minnesota faculty
1958 births
City College of New York alumni
American condensed matter physicists
20th-century American physicists
Fellows of the American Physical Society